Blaibach (Northern Bavarian: Bloaba) is a municipality in the district of Cham in Bavaria in Germany.

Mayors
The mayor is Wolfgang Eckl (CSU/Freie Bürger). Since 2014 he is the successor of Ludwig Baumgartner (CSU/Freie Bürger). Another former mayor is Karl Trenner (CSU/Freie Bürger).

See also
Gotteszell–Blaibach railway

References

Cham (district)